Demetriades is a surname. Notable people with the surname include:

Andrea Demetriades (born 1983), Australian actress
Marios Demetriades (born 1971), Cypriot politician
Mircea Demetriade (1861–1914), Romanian poet, playwright, and actor
Panicos O. Demetriades (born 1959), Cypriot economist